Lecanomerus angulatus is an insect-eating ground beetle of the Lecanomerus genus, found in Australia.

References

Harpalinae
Beetles described in 1871